Power is an unincorporated community in Brooke County, West Virginia, United States.

The community was named for a nearby power plant.

References 

Unincorporated communities in West Virginia
Unincorporated communities in Brooke County, West Virginia